Myles Keogh  (died 30 August 1952) was an Irish politician, physician and surgeon. He was first elected to Dáil Éireann as an independent Teachta Dála (TD) for Dublin South at the 1922 general election. He was re-elected as an independent TD at the 1923 and June 1927 general elections.

At the September 1927 general election, he was elected as a Cumann na nGaedheal TD, and was re-elected at the 1932 general election. He lost his seat at the 1933 general election but was elected as a Fine Gael TD at the 1937 general election. He again lost his seat at the 1938 general election.

He was Sheriff of Dublin City in 1917.

References

Year of birth missing
1952 deaths
Independent TDs
Cumann na nGaedheal TDs
Fine Gael TDs
High Sheriffs of Dublin City
Members of the 3rd Dáil
Members of the 4th Dáil
Members of the 5th Dáil
Members of the 6th Dáil
Members of the 7th Dáil
Members of the 9th Dáil
Politicians from County Dublin
People of the Irish Civil War (Pro-Treaty side)